"I Believe in You (You Believe in Me)" is a song written and produced  by Don Davis and recorded by Johnnie Taylor. The single was also certified gold by the RIAA for sales of one million copies.

Background
Davis had originally begun writing the song in 1965.  When he found himself two songs short while working to complete Taylor's Taylored in Silk LP, Davis chose "I Believe in You (You Believe in Me) as one of the songs that would fill out the album. The basic track was cut at Muscle Shoals Sound in Alabama with members of its famed rhythm section: bassist David Hood, drummer Roger Hawkins, guitarist Jimmy Johnson, keyboardist Barry Beckett, and Davis later overdubbed strings at United Sound Recording Studio, the recording studio in Detroit that Davis had bought in 1971.

Chart performance
Released as a single in the summer of 1973, "I Believe in You (You Believe in Me)" was one of the biggest hits of Taylor's career, holding the #1 spot on Billboard's Hot Soul Singles Chart for two weeks , reaching the number eleven position on the Billboard Pop Singles chart, and #35 in Canada.

References 

1973 singles
Songs written by Don Davis (record producer)
1973 songs
Stax Records singles
Song recordings produced by Don Davis (record producer)